Benguela-Belize Lobito-Tomboco is a  offshore compliant tower oil platform off the coast of Angola, located in water  deep in the lower Congo basin. It is owned and run by the Chevron Corporation.

References

External links
 Chevron Corporation

Oil platforms